Ivana Chýlková (born 27 September 1963) is a Czech actress. She appeared in more than eighty films since 1983. 

In 1985, she graduated from DAMU. She has appeared in several Theatre Studio DVA productions.

Chýlková is married to actor Jan Kraus.

Selected filmography

References

External links
 

1963 births
Living people
Actresses from Prague
Czech film actresses
Czech television actresses
20th-century Czech actresses
21st-century Czech actresses
People from Frýdek-Místek
Academy of Performing Arts in Prague alumni
Czech Lion Awards winners
Czech stage actresses